The women's middle distance competition in orienteering at the 2005 World Games took place on 16 July 2005 in the Jahnstadion in Bottrop, Germany.

Competition format
A total of 39 athletes entered the competition. Every athlete had to check in at control points, which were located across the course.

Results

References

External links
 Results on IOF website

Orienteering at the 2005 World Games